Ziziphus abyssinica is a species of shrub in the family Rhamnaceae.

It is endemic to dryer habitats across tropical Africa, south of the Sahel and north of the southern African deserts.

Description
Ziziphus abyssinica has distinct pairs of one hooked and one straight thorn, similar to the related southern African Ziziphus mucronata.

External links
Entry in the African Plant Database — with distribution map.
Entry in AgroForestryTree Database

Fruits originating in Africa
Trees of Africa
Flora of Northeast Tropical Africa
Flora of South Tropical Africa
Flora of West Tropical Africa
Flora of West-Central Tropical Africa
Flora of East Tropical Africa
abyssinica